Future Surface Combatant is the designation of shipbuilding programs for:

Future Surface Combatant (Koninklijke Marine), the Netherlands and Belgium
Future Surface Combatant (Royal Navy), United Kingdom
Future Surface Combatant (U.S. Navy) or DDG(X), United States